Derebaşı is a small village in Bozyazı district of Mersin Province, Turkey. It is situated to the northeast of Bozyazı. The population of the village was 53. as of 2012.

References

Villages in Bozyazı District